"Private Eyes" is a 1981 single by Hall & Oates and the title track from their album of the same name. The song was number one on the Billboard Hot 100 charts for two weeks, from November 7 through November 20, 1981. This single was the band's third of six number one hits (the first two being "Rich Girl" and "Kiss on My List"), and their second number one hit of the 1980s. It was succeeded in the number one position by Olivia Newton-John's "Physical," which was coincidentally succeeded by another single from Hall & Oates, "I Can't Go for That (No Can Do)".

Background and writing
The tune for Private Eyes was written by Warren Pash and Janna Allen, with arrangement and chords by Daryl Hall. In an interview with American Songwriter, Daryl Hall states: "That's a real Janna Allen (co-writer and sister of Sara Allen) song. Janna, and I, and Warren Pash wrote that. Warren and Janna wrote most of the song, and I took it and changed it around – changed the chords. Sandy (Sara Allen) and I wrote the lyrics. It's a real family song, the Allen sisters and me."

The single carries a similar rhythm to the duo's number one hit from earlier that year, "Kiss on My List," with the difference being a handclap chorus that has made the song an audience-participation favorite at live Hall and Oates shows. It was one of the duo's first songs to appear in heavy rotation on MTV.

Record World called it a "perfectly-crafted title cut" from the album.

Music video

The music video features the band dressed as stereotypical film-noir style, trenchcoat-wearing private detectives.

It was the first to feature the backup band of guitarist G. E. Smith, bassist Tom "T-Bone" Wolk, drummer Mickey Curry, and saxophonist/keyboardist Charles DeChant.

Personnel
Daryl Hall – lead and backing vocals, keyboards, synthesizer
John Oates – rhythm guitar, backing vocals
G.E. Smith – lead guitar
John Siegler - bass
Mickey Curry – drums

Chart performance

Weekly charts

Year-end charts

See also
List of Billboard Hot 100 number-one singles of 1981

References

1981 singles
Hall & Oates songs
Billboard Hot 100 number-one singles
Cashbox number-one singles
Songs written by Daryl Hall
Songs written by Janna Allen
RCA Records singles
Songs written by Sara Allen
1981 songs